Boris Yevseyevich Bychowsky (Борис Евсеевич Быховский, 27 August 1908 – 26 January 1974) was a Soviet scientist and parasitologist, specialist of fish parasites, especially monogeneans. He was director of the Institute of Zoology of the Academy of Sciences of the Soviet Union in Leningrad (1962–1974). Bychowsky is the author of more than 100 scientific publications, mostly on systematics of monogeneans. His most famous work was his monography on monogeneans (1957), which was translated into English in 1961.

Education
1930: graduated from the biology department of Physics and Mathematics Faculty of Leningrad State University
1935: PhD in biological sciences
1956: Habilitation in biological sciences

Career
1929–1935: Laboratory of fish diseases Institute of Fisheries (Leningrad); 
1935–1940: Zoological Institute of the Academy of Sciences of the Soviet Union
1940–1944: Deputy Chairman of the Presidium of the Tajikistan Branch of the Academy of Sciences of the Soviet Union
1942–1962: Deputy director of the Zoological Institute of the Academy of Sciences of the Soviet Union in Leningrad
1962–1974: Director of the Zoological Institute of the Academy of Sciences of the Soviet Union

Honours
1963: Academician-Secretary of the Department of General Biology, Academy of Sciences of the Soviet Union
1964: Academy of Sciences of the Soviet Union
Order of Lenin
Order of the Red Banner of Labour

Taxa named in his honour

The following taxa were created in his honour. Most are parasites of fish.

Family
 Bychowskicotylidae Lebedev, 1969

Genera
Bychowskicotyle Lebedev, 1969
Bychowskya Nagibina, 1968
Bychowskyella Akhmerov, 1952, including Bychowskyella bychowskii Gusev, 1977 (both genus and species names dedicated to Bychowsky)
Bychowskymonogenea Caballero & Bravo-Hollis, 1972

Species
Numerous species of monogeneans, including Absonifibula bychowskyi Lawler & Overstreet, 1976, Caniongiella bychowskyi Lebedev, 1976, Cribromazocraes bychowskyi Mamaev, 1981, Dicrumenia bychowskyi Mamaev, 1969, Dionchus bychowskyi Timofeeva, 1989, Euryhaliotrema bychowskyi (Obodnikova, 1976) Kritsky & Boeger, 2002, Gyrodactyloides bychowskii Albova, 1948, Gyrodactylus bychowskyi (Albova, 1948), Heterobothrium bychowskyi Ogawa, 1991, Mazocraeoides bychowskyi Caballero & Caballero, 1976, Mexicana bychowskyi Caballero & Bravo-Hollis, 1959, Mexicotrema bychowskyi Lamothe-Argumedo, 1969, Murraytrema bychowskyi Oliver, 1987, Murraytrematoides bychowskii (Nagibina, 1976) Oliver, 1987, Neohaliotrema bychowskii Zhukov, 1976, Neoheterocotyle bychowskyi (Timofeeva, 1981) Chisholm, 1994, Neotetraonchus bychowskyi Bravo-Hollis, 1968, Osphyobothrus bychowskyi Khoche & Chauhan, 1969, Pseudaxinoides bychowskyi Lebedev, 1977, Pseudodiplectanum bychowskii Nagibina, 1977, digeneans such as Genolopa bychowskii Zhukov, 1977, Hysterogonia bychowskii Korotaeva, 1972, and Phyllodistomum borisbychowskyi Caballero y Caballero, 1969, parasitic isopods such as Cymothoa bychowskyi Avdeev, 1979 and parasitic copepods such as Lepeophtheirus bychowskyi Gusev, 1951, and the Microsporidia Glugea bychowsky Gasimagomedov & Issi, 1970. In addition to all these fish parasites, the biting midge Culicoides bychowskyi Dzhafarov, 1964 (Ceratopogonidae, Diptera) was also named after Bychowsky.

References

External links

1908 births
1974 deaths
Scientists from Saint Petersburg
Full Members of the USSR Academy of Sciences
Saint Petersburg State University alumni
Recipients of the Order of Lenin
Recipients of the Order of the Red Banner of Labour
Zoologists with author abbreviations
Soviet zoologists
Burials at Bogoslovskoe Cemetery
Soviet parasitologists